Flexitrichum is a genus of haplolepideous mosses (Dicranidae) in the family Flexitrichaceae.

Species
The genus contains two species:

Flexitrichum flexicaule 
Flexitrichum gracile 

These species were previously considered members of the genus Ditrichum in the family Ditrichaceae, either as two species or both included in Ditrichum flexicaule.

References

Bryopsida
Moss genera
Taxonomy articles created by Polbot